John Tyler House may refer to:

Sherwood Forest Plantation, in Charles City County, Virginia, homestead of U.S. Presidents William Henry Harrison and John Tyler, listed on NRHP as John Tyler House 
John Tyler House (Branford, Connecticut), listed on the NRHP in New Haven County, Connecticut